I Luv Money Records is a German hip hop record label, founded in 2001 by King Orgasmus One, Bass Sultan Hengzt, D-Bo and Bushido.

Artists

Amir
 Clickx
 Godsilla
 JokA
 Murdoch
 Sera Finale
 DJ Jim Tonic

Releases 

|Capo Fiasko - Capokalypse
Released: 2003
Chart positions:
RIAA certification:
Singles:
|-
|F.A.T. - Drive-By In E-Moll
Released: 2003
Chart positions:
RIAA certification:
Singles:
|-
|Serk - Serkulation
Released: 2003
Chart positions:
RIAA certification:
Singles:
|-
|Godsilla - Übertalentiert
Released: 2004
Chart positions:
RIAA certification:
Singles:
|-
|King Orgasmus One - Es gibt kein Battle
Released: 2004
Chart positions:
RIAA certification:
Singles:
|-
|Various Artists - Orgi Pörnchen 2 - Der Soundtrack
Released: 2004
Chart positions:
RIAA certification:
Singles:
|-
|Roulette - Asphalt ist kalt
Released: 2004
Chart positions:
RIAA certification:
Singles:
|-
|Clickx - Cheetazweedndirtywiggaz
Released: 2005
Chart positions:
RIAA certification:
Singles:
|-
|King Orgasmus One - Orgi's Greatest Hits - A.N.A.L. (Alles nur aus Liebe)
Released: 2005
Chart positions:
RIAA certification:
Singles:
|-
|King Orgasmus One & Godsilla - Schmutzige Euros
Released: 2005
Chart positions:
RIAA certification:
Singles:
|-
|Various Artists - Orgi Pörnchen 3 - Der Soundtrack
Released: 2005
Chart positions:
RIAA certification:
Singles:
|-
|Soldiers Of Darklife - Im Schatten der Mafia
Released: 2005
Chart positions:
RIAA certification:
Singles:
|-
|Clickx - Ready to rumble
Released: 2006
Chart positions:
RIAA certification:
Singles:
|-
|Godsilla - Massenhysterie
Released: 2006
Chart positions:
RIAA certification:
Singles:
|-
|King Orgasmus One - OrgiAnal Arschgeil
Released: 2006
Chart positions:
RIAA certification:
Singles:
|-
|Various Artists - Orgi Pörnchen 4 - Der Soundtrack
Released: 2006
Chart positions:
RIAA certification:
Singles:
|-
|Godsilla - Übertalentiert - Premium Edition
Released: 2007
Chart positions:
RIAA certification:
Singles:
|-
|King Orgasmus One & Godsilla - Schmutzige Euros 2
Released: 2007
Chart positions:
RIAA certification:
Singles:
|-
|King Orgasmus One - La Petite Mort
Released: 2007
Chart positions:
RIAA certification:
Singles:
|-
|Amir - Explosiv
Released: 2007
Chart positions:
RIAA certification:
Singles:
|-
|Sera Finale - Die nächste Kugel im Lauf
Released: 2007
Chart positions:
RIAA certification:
Singles:
|-
|Imbiss Bronko - Currywurst mit Darm
Released: October 19, 2007
Chart positions:
RIAA certification:
Singles:
|-
|Godsilla - City Of God
Released: 2007
Chart positions:
RIAA certification:
Singles:
|-
|Amir - Explosiv
Released: 2008
Chart positions:
RIAA certification:
Singles:
|-
|Various Artists - Orgi Pörnchen 5
Released: 2008
Chart positions:
RIAA certification:
|-
|King Orgasmus - Best of Pörnchen 
Released: 2008
Chart positions:
RIAA certification:
|-
|King Orgasmus One - Liebe ist schön (Best of)
Released: 2008
Chart positions:
RIAA certification:
|-
|JokA - Gehirnwäsche
Released: 2008
Chart positions:
RIAA certification:
|-
|Imbiss Bronko - Bronko im Kalorienreich 
Released: 2008
Chart positions:
RIAA certification:
|}

German independent record labels